Cavalla may refer to:

Fish
 A vernacular name used for several fish species in the families Carangidae and Scombridae:
 Caranx
 Crevalle jack Caranx hippos (cavalla)
 Bar jack Carangoides ruber (blue striped cavalla)
 Scomber
 Atlantic mackerel Scomber scombrus (cavalla)
 Chub mackerel Scomber japonicus (cavalla vera)
 Carangoides
 Blue trevally Carangoides ferdau (Ferdau's cavalla)
 Longnose trevally Carangoides chrysophrys (long nose cavalla)
 Longfin trevally Carangoides armatus (long fin cavalla)
 Malabar trevally Carangoides malabaricus (Malabar cavalla)
 Whitefin trevally Carangoides equula (white fin cavalla)

Other uses
USS Cavalla, the name of two U.S. Navy submarines
Cavalla River, in West Africa

See also
Kavala (disambiguation)